Leslie Frank Asling (7 March 1912 – 16 August 1990) was an Australian rules footballer who played with Collingwood, Essendon and Hawthorn in the Victorian Football League (VFL).

Asling attended Dandenong High School and initially played football for Berwick, where he was halfback and follower. He transferred to Belgrave in 1932 and then in the 1934 season played four games for the Collingwood seconds before being promoted to the seniors where he played five games that year. After failing to make Collingwood's list in 1935, Asling moved to Essendon and made seven appearances for them that year. After again failing to make a list in his second year, in 1936 Asling transferred to Hawthorn where he made two senior appearances. In 1937 he returned to Belgrave.

Asling served in both the Australian Army and the Royal Australian Air Force during World War II.

Notes

External links 

Frank Asling's profile at Collingwood Forever

1912 births
1990 deaths
Australian rules footballers from Melbourne
Collingwood Football Club players
Essendon Football Club players
Hawthorn Football Club players
Australian Army personnel of World War II
Royal Australian Air Force personnel of World War II
Australian Army soldiers
Royal Australian Air Force airmen
Military personnel from Melbourne
People from Berwick, Victoria